Dean Ehehalt (born September 10, 1964) is an American college baseball coach, currently serving as head coach of the Monmouth Hawks baseball team. He was named to that position prior to the 1994 season.

Raised in Middletown Township, New Jersey, Ehehalt played baseball at Middletown High School North.

Ehehalt played two seasons at Brookdale Community College before completing his career at East Carolina.  He spent one season as a graduate assistant with the Pirates before one season as an assistant at Princeton.  He returned for one year to complete a master's at East Carolina in 1990, then spent a season as an assistant at Kennesaw State.  In 1992, he earned his first head coaching job and helped engineer a turnaround at Upsala.  After two seasons, he became head coach at Monmouth.  In his time with the Hawks, he has led the team to eight league regular season titles, 16 twenty-win seasons and 6 thirty-win campaigns.

Together with his wife and daughter, Ehehalt has been a resident of Wall Township, New Jersey.

Head coaching record

See also
List of current NCAA Division I baseball coaches

References

Living people
1964 births
Baseball players from New Jersey
Middletown High School North alumni
People from Middletown Township, New Jersey
People from Wall Township, New Jersey
Sportspeople from Monmouth County, New Jersey
Brookdale Jersey Blues baseball players
East Carolina Pirates baseball coaches
East Carolina Pirates baseball players
Kennesaw State Owls baseball coaches
Monmouth Hawks baseball coaches
Princeton Tigers baseball coaches
Upsala Vikings baseball coaches
Baseball coaches from New Jersey